Malo is a genus of box jellies. It contains four species, three of which were described by the Australian marine biologist Lisa-Ann Gershwin.

Species
The World Register of Marine Species lists the following four species:
Malo bella Gershwin, 2014 
Malo filipina Bentlage & Lewis, 2012 
Malo kingi Gershwin, 2007 
Malo maxima Gershwin, 2005

References

Carukiidae
Medusozoa genera